Lauren Gail Berlant (October 31, 1957 – June 28, 2021) was an American scholar, cultural theorist, and author who is regarded as "one of the most esteemed and influential literary and cultural critics in the United States." Berlant was the George M. Pullman Distinguished Service Professor of English at the University of Chicago, where they taught from 1984 until 2021. Berlant wrote and taught issues of intimacy and belonging in popular culture, in relation to the history and fantasy of citizenship.

Berlant wrote on public spheres as they affect worlds, where affect and emotion lead the way for belonging ahead of the modes of rational or deliberative thought. These attach strangers to each other and shape the terms of the state-civil society relation.

Early life and education 
Berlant was born on October 31, 1957, in Philadelphia, Pennsylvania.  They graduated with a BA in English from Oberlin College in 1979, then an MA from Cornell University in 1983, and finally a PhD from Cornell in 1985, after they had already begun teaching at the University of Chicago. (They said student loans obliged them to continue straight through school without a break that would have triggered loan repayment.) Berlant's dissertation was titled, Executing The Love Plot: Hawthorne and The Romance of Power (1985).

Career
Berlant taught at the University of Chicago from 1984 to 2021, becoming the George M. Pullman Distinguished Service Professor of English. The university awarded them a Quantrell Award for Excellence in Undergraduate Teaching (1989), a Faculty Award for Excellence in Graduate Teaching and Mentoring (2005), and the Norman Maclean Faculty Award (2019).

Berlant's other honors included a Guggenheim Fellowship and, for their book Cruel Optimism, the René Wellek Prize of the American Comparative Literature Association and the Alan Bray Memorial Book Award from the Modern Language Association (MLA) for the best book in queer studies in literature or cultural studies. Berlant was elected to the American Academy of Arts and Sciences in 2018.

Berlant was a founding member of Feel Tank Chicago in 2002, a play on think tank. They worked with many journals, including (as editor) Critical Inquiry. They also edited Duke University Press's Theory Q series along with Lee Edelman, Benjamin Kahan, and Christina Sharpe.

Works
Berlant was the author of a national sentimentality trilogy beginning with The Anatomy of National Fantasy:  Hawthorne, Utopia, and Everyday Life (University of Chicago Press, 1991). Based on their dissertation, the book looks at the formation of national identity as the relations between modes of belonging mediated by the state and law; by aesthetics, especially genre; and by the everyday life of social relations, drawing on Nathaniel Hawthorne's work to illustrate these operations.

The Queen of America Goes to Washington City: Essays on Sex and Citizenship—the title essay winning the 1993 Norman Foerster Award for best essay of the year in American literature—introduced the idea of the "intimate public sphere" and looks at the production of politics and publicness since the Reagan era by way of the circulation of the personal, the sexual, and the intimate. In his review, José Muñoz described it as both intersectional, following Kimberlé Crenshaw, and "post-Habermassian", in the vein of work by Nancy Fraser and Berlant's frequent collaborator Michael Warner. Berlant's third book (though second in the trilogy), The Female Complaint: On the Unfinished Business of Sentimentality in American Culture was published by Duke University Press in 2008. The project initially began in the 1980s when Berlant noticed striking similarities in writing by Erma Bombeck and Fanny Fern, who skewered married life for women in nearly identical ways despite being separated by 150 years. Berlant pursued this mass cultural phenomenon of "women's culture" as an originating site of “intimate publics", threading the everyday institutions of intimacy, mass society, and, more distantly and ambivalently, politics through fantasies rather than ideology. Berlant took up this project by examining especially melodramas and their remade movies in the first part of the twentieth century, such as Show Boat, Imitation of Life, and Uncle Tom's Cabin.

Berlant's 2011 book, Cruel Optimism (Duke University Press) works its way across the U.S. and Europe to assess the level of contemporary crisis as neoliberalism wears away the fantasies of upward mobility associated with the liberal state. Cruel optimism manifests as a relational dynamic in which individuals create attachment as "clusters of promises" toward desired object-ideas even when they inhibit the conditions for flourishing and fulfilling such promises. Maintaining attachments that sustain the good life fantasy, no matter how injurious or cruel these attachments may be, allows people to make it through day-to-day life when the day-to-day has become unlivable. Elaborating on the specific dynamics of cruel optimism, Berlant emphasizes and maintains that it is not the object itself, but rather the relationship:

A relation of cruel optimism is a double-bind in which your attachment to an object sustains you in life at the same time as that object is actually a threat to your flourishing. So you can't say that there are objects that have the quality of cruelty or not cruelty, it's how you have the relationship to them. Like it might be that being in a couple is not a relation of cruel optimism for you, because being in a couple actually makes you feel like you have a grounding in the world, whereas for other people, being in a couple might be, on the one hand, a relief from loneliness, and on the other hand, the overpresence of one person who has to bear the burden of satisfying all your needs. So it's not the object that's the problem, but how we learn to be in relation.

An emphasis on the "present", which Berlant describes as structured through "crisis ordinariness", turns to affect and aesthetics as a way of apprehending these crises. Berlant suggests that it becomes possible to recognize that certain "genres" are no longer sustainable in the present and that new emergent aesthetic forms are taking hold that allow us to recognize modes of living not rooted in normative good life fantasies. Discussing crisis ordinariness, Berlant described it as their way "of talking about traumas of the social that are lived through collectively and that transform the sensorium to a heightened perceptiveness about the unfolding of the historical, and sometimes historic, moment (and sometimes publics organized around those senses, when experienced collectively)."

In 2019, Berlant published The Hundreds with Kathleen Stewart, a collection of brief writing (a hundred words or a multiple of a hundred words) on ordinary encounters, applying affect theory to moments of unexamined daily life. In The New Yorker, Hua Hsu said the book "calls to mind the adventurous, hybrid style of Fred Moten (the book includes a brief poem by him), Maggie Nelson, or Claudia Rankine, all of whom bend available literary forms into workable vessels for new ideas."

Berlant has edited books on Compassion (2004) and Intimacy (2001), which are interlinked with their seminal work in feminist and queer theory in essays like "What Does Queer Theory Teach Us About X?" (with Michael Warner, 1995), "Sex in Public" (with Michael Warner, 1998), Our Monica, Ourselves:  Clinton and the Affairs of State (edited with Lisa Duggan, 2001), and Venus Inferred (with photographer Laura Letinsky, 2001).

Death
Berlant died of cancer in a Chicago hospice facility on June 28, 2021, at age 63. They are survived by their partner Ian Horswill.

Berlant's papers are held at the Feminist Theory Archive of the Pembroke Center for Teaching and Research on Women at Brown University. Berlant began donating them in 2014.

Bibliography

Books

 2011 René Wellek Prize, American Comparative Literature Association

Edited collections

See also
Achille Mbembe
Jasbir Puar
Necropolitics

Notes

References

External links
 University of Chicago faculty page 
 Berlant's blog, Supervalent Thought
 Lauren Berlant Papers—Pembroke Center Archives, Brown University

1957 births
2021 deaths
American academics of English literature
Cornell University alumni
Gender studies academics
Jewish American writers
Jewish philosophers
Oberlin College alumni
Queer theorists
University of Chicago faculty